The 1940 WANFL season was the 56th season of the various incarnations of the Western Australian National Football League. It saw Claremont win its third consecutive premiership, but its last before returning to the status of cellar-dweller it occupied during its first decade in the WA(N)FL – between 1943 and 1978 Claremont played finals only five times for one premiership. South Fremantle, after a lean period in the middle 1930s, displaced perennial power clubs East Fremantle and East Perth as the Tigers’ Grand Final opponent, and established some of the basis, in spite of three disastrous wartime under-age seasons, for the club's fabled dynasty after the war.

The season was severely affected by World War II, which claimed numerous players from all clubs and limited the availability of others, and also a dispute with the Perth City Council over charges for the rental of Leederville and Perth Ovals, which were not resolved fully before the season. Consequently, East Perth and West Perth were forced to play home games at either the WACA or Subiaco Oval; however this did not affect their performance and the Cardinals, with young players like Bill Baker, “Spike” Pola and “Pops” Heal coming of age, improved from one win in 1939 to eleven this season – and would have done better but for appendicitis ending Ted Tyson’s football after June.

Swan Districts, affected by the retirement of early stalwarts Jim Ditchburn and George Krepp, the loss early in the season of Jack Murray, and the recruitment of numerous players to the services, suffered despite the return of champion spearhead Holdsworth who was third in the goalkicking with 73 its first wooden spoon with only two wins. More surprisingly Perth – who had looked the previous season to be emerging from twenty years in the doldrums – could not replace captain-coach Austin Robertson and lost all but one of its final thirteen games for its worst record since 1923.

Notable highlights included the first double-century score in Perth senior football and two record comebacks over the final three quarters.

Home-and-away season

Round 1

Round 2 (Labour Day)

Round 3

Round 4

Round 5

Round 6

Round 7

Round 8

Round 9

Round 10

Round 11

Round 12

Round 13

Round 14

Round 15 (Foundation Day)

Round 16

Round 17

Round 18

Round 19

Round 20

Ladder

Finals

First semi-final

Second semi-final

Preliminary final

Grand Final

Notes
As of 2014, Perth have never drawn any senior WA(N)FL match with either Subiaco or South Fremantle.

References

External links
Official WAFL website
Western Australian National Football League (WANFL), 1940

West Australian Football League seasons
WANFL